The Happy Jazz of Rex Stewart, also reissued as The Rex Stewart Memorial Album, is an album by cornetist Rex Stewart which was recorded in 1960 and released on Prestige Records' subsidiary Swingville label.

Reception

Scott Yanow of AllMusic states, "Stewart's technique and range had shrunk a bit by 1960, but his sense of humor and ability to make colorful tonal variations were still very much intact. This is a particularly fun set with Stewart doubling on kazoo and taking three good-time vocals ... The music is full of good spirits and memorable moments ... Highly recommended and well worth searching for."

Track listing
 "Red Ribbon" (Dorothy J. Odam) – 3:04
 "If I Could Be With You (One Hour Tonight)" (James P. Johnson, Henry Creamer) – 2:52
 "Rasputin" (Rex Stewart) – 7:30
 "Please Don't Talk About Me When I'm Gone" (Sam H. Stept, Sidney Clare) – 3:28
 "Four or Five Times" (Byron Gay, Marco Hellman) – 2:48
 "You Can Depend On Me" (Charles Carpenter, Louis Dunlap, Earl Hines) – 3:48
 "San" (Lindsay McPhail, Walter Michels) – 3:23
 "I Would Do Most Anything for You" (Harry Warren, Mack Gordon) – 4:00
 "Tell Me" (Rex Stewart) – 3:40
 "Nagasaki" (Warren, Mort Dixon) – 2:38

Personnel
Rex Stewart – cornet, kazoo, vocals
John Dengler – bass saxophone, kazoo, washboard
Wilbert Kirk – harmonica, tambourine
Jerome Darr, Chauncey "Lord" Westbrook – guitar 
Benny Moten – bass
Chuck Lampkin – drums

References

Rex Stewart albums
1960 albums
Swingville Records albums
Albums recorded at Van Gelder Studio
Albums produced by Esmond Edwards